Homer Estell Ezzell (February 28, 1896 – August 3, 1976) was a third baseman in Major League Baseball who played from 1923 through 1925 for the St. Louis Browns (1923) and Boston Red Sox (1924–25). He was born in Victoria, Texas.

In a three-season career, Ezzell was a .264 hitter (196-for-236) with 61 RBI in 236 games played, including 106 runs, 20 doubles, eight triples and 25 stolen bases. He did not hit a home run.

Ezzell died in San Antonio, Texas at age 80.

References

Boston Red Sox players
St. Louis Browns players
Major League Baseball third basemen
Baseball players from Texas
People from Victoria, Texas
1896 births
1976 deaths